The Basilica Cistern, or Cisterna Basilica (or , "Subterranean Cistern" or "Subterranean Palace"), is the largest of several hundred ancient cisterns that lie beneath the city of Istanbul, Turkey.

History

This subterranean cistern was called Basilica because it was located under a large public square, the Stoa Basilica, on the First Hill of Constantinople. Prior to its construction, a great basilica stood on the spot. It had been built during the Early Roman Age between the 3rd and 4th centuries as a commercial, legal and artistic centre. The basilica was reconstructed by Illus after a fire in 476.

Ancient texts indicated that the basilica contained gardens, was surrounded by a colonnade and faced the Hagia Sophia. According to ancient historians, Emperor Constantine built a structure that was later reconstructed and enlarged by Emperor Justinian after the Nika riots of 532, which devastated the city.

Historical texts claim that 7,000 slaves were involved in the construction of the cistern.

The enlarged cistern provided a water filtration system for the Great Palace of Constantinople and other buildings on the First Hill, and continued to provide water to the Topkapı Palace after the Ottoman conquest in 1453 and into modern times.

The existence of the cistern was eventually forgotten by all but the locals who still drew water from it until, in 1565, the French traveller Petrus Gyllius left a record of it. Gyllius recorded being rowed in between the columns and seeing fish swimming in the water beneath the boat.

Measurements and data
The capitals of the columns are mainly in the Ionic and Corinthian style, with the exception of a few Doric capitals with no engravings. One of the columns is carved with raised pictures of a Hen's Eye, slanted branches, and tears, and resembles the columns of the  4th-century Triumphal Arch of Theodosius I (AD 379–395), erected in the 'Forum Tauri' Square, today's Beyazıt Square. Ancient texts suggest that the tears on the column pay tribute to the hundreds of slaves who died during the construction of the Basilica Cistern. The majority of the columns in the cistern appear to have been recycled from the ruins of older buildings (a process called 'spoliation'), likely brought to Constantinople from various parts of the empire, together with those that were used in the construction of Hagia Sophia. They are carved out of different types of marble and granite.

It traveled via the  Valens (Bozdoğan) Aqueduct, and the original  Mağlova Aqueduct, which was built by the Emperor Justinian.

The weight of the cistern is carried on the columns by means of the cross-shaped vaults and round arches of its roof.

The Basilica Cistern has been restored several times since its original creation. The first repairs were carried out in the 18th century during the reign of the Ottoman sultan Ahmed III in 1723 by the architect Muhammad Ağa of Kayseri. The second major repair was completed during the 19th century reign of Sultan Abdulhamid II (1876–1909). Cracks in the masonry and damaged columns were repaired in 1968, with additional restoration in 1985 by the Istanbul Metropolitan Museum. During the 1985 restoration, 50,000 tons of mud were removed from the cistern, and platforms were erected to replace the boats previously used for touring the cistern. The cistern was opened to the public on 9 September 1987. It underwent additional cleaning In May 1994. Then in 2017 it was once again closed for restoration and earthquake-proofing, reopening to the public in 2022.

Medusa column bases

The bases of two columns In the northwest corner of the cistern reuse blocks carved with the face of Medusa. The origin of the two heads is unknown, though it is thought that they were brought to the cistern after being removed from a building of the late Roman period. There is no evidence to suggest that they were previously used as column bases. Tradition has it that the blocks are oriented sideways and inverted in order to negate the power of the Gorgons' gaze; but it is more likely that the stones were treated as mere rubble to be reused in a setting not originally intended to be viewed by visitors.

In popular culture
The cistern was used as a location for the 1963 James Bond film From Russia with Love. In the film, it is referred to as having been constructed by the Emperor Constantine, with no reference to Justinian, and is fictitiously located under the Soviet consulate. In reality it is a long way away from the former Soviet (now Russian) consulate in Beyoğlu.

The cistern plays a key role in Dorothy Dunnett's historical novel Pawn in Frankincense (1969), fourth volume of The Lymond Chronicles. 

In the fantasy series The Old Kingdom, the reservoir beneath the palace in Belisaere was inspired by the cistern.

The finale of the 2009 film The International takes place in a fantasy amalgam of the Old City, depicting the Basilica Cistern as lying beneath the Sultan Ahmed Mosque, which, in the film, is directly adjacent to the Süleymaniye Mosque.

In the 2011 video game, Assassin's Creed: Revelations, the player-controlled character, Ezio Auditore, is given the chance to explore a section of this cistern in a memory sequence entitled The Yerebatan Cistern.

The cistern also features in Jean-Baptiste Andrea's film thriller Brotherhood of Tears (2013). In the sequence, the lead character, acting as a transporter (played by Jeremie Renier), delivers a suitcase to a mysterious client (played by Turkish actor Ali Pinar). 

The cistern with its inverted Medusa pillar featured in the 2013 Dan Brown novel Inferno (as well as its 2016 film adaptation).

Gallery

See also
Cistern of Philoxenos (Istanbul)
Theodosius Cistern (Istanbul)
List of Roman cisterns
History of Roman and Byzantine domes

References

Further reading

External links 

Byzantium 1200 | Basilica Cistern

6th-century religious buildings and structures
Byzantine secular architecture
Roman cisterns
Cisterns in Istanbul
Reservoirs in Turkey
Tourist attractions in Istanbul
6th century in the Byzantine Empire
Fatih
Cultural depictions of Medusa